George Taylor Fulford (6 May 1902 – 15 December 1987) was a Canadian businessman and politician who served as a Liberal party member of the House of Commons of Canada. Fulford was born in Brockville, Ontario, and he became an executive and manufacturer, particularly as president of medicine manufacturer G. T. Fulford Co.

Life and career 
Fulford graduated from the University of Toronto, and he also attended Harvard University.

In 1934, Fulford was elected as a Liberal to the Ontario legislature for the Leeds riding, serving under Mitchell Hepburn's government. After leaving provincial politics due to his defeat in 1937, Fulford was elected to the House of Commons for the Leeds riding in the 1940 federal election. He was defeated in the 1945 federal election by George Robert Webb of the Progressive Conservative party.

Fulford returned to Parliament by winning the riding in the 1949 federal election over a new Progressive Conservative candidate, John Lionel Carroll. After that term, Fulford was defeated by the Progressive Conservative party's Hayden Stanton in 1953. Fulford was unsuccessful in unseating Stanton in the 1957 and 1958 elections.

Fulford switched his support to the Progressive Conservative party in 1970, following a dispute over federal Liberal language policies. He died at a hospital in Brockville in 1987, at the age of 85.

References

External links
 
 

1902 births
1987 deaths
Harvard University alumni
Liberal Party of Canada MPs
Ontario Liberal Party MPPs
Members of the House of Commons of Canada from Ontario
People from Brockville
University of Toronto alumni